Anthopsis is a genus of fungi in the family Dermateaceae containing 3 species. Colonies (PDA) grow slowly, are velvety to lanose, coloured olivaceous-grey to mouse grey with the reverse black.

Microscopy 
Phialides ovoidal, ellipsoidal, subspherical, or ampulliform, 5-8 x 2-3 µm, forming compact lateral clusters on undifferentiated hyphae; generally the distinctive collarette is located at the base of the phialide. Conidia triangular, smooth-walled, 2.0-3.5 µm long, usually adhering in dense masses.

See also
 List of Dermateaceae genera

References

Helotiales genera